Frank W. Schofield (1889–1970) was a British-born Canadian veterinarian and Protestant missionary who was involved in the Korean independence movement against the Japanese Empire.

Schofield graduated in 1910 from the Ontario Veterinary College, then in Toronto. He lived in Korea from 1916 to 1920, where he taught at the Severance Hospital Medical School and became involved in the Korean independence movement against the Japanese Empire. In possession of a camera, Schofield took photographs of independence protests, Japanese police and military, as well as rural villages in Suwon that were destroyed by the Japanese in 1919. He wrote about massacres that occurred in several rural villages in April 1919 in articles published in several newspapers and journals, as well as by investigative publications as part of the March 1st Movement. In 1920, he returned to his teaching position at the Ontario Veterinary College, first in Toronto and later in Guelph, Ontario. 

Schofield elucidated the etiology and pathology of moldy sweet clover poisoning, which led to the discovery of the anticoagulant warfarin.

After his retirement from OVC in 1955, he returned to Korea and taught at the Veterinary College of Seoul National University. He died in Seoul in 1970 and was buried in the Korean National Cemetery, the first foreigner to be so honored.

References

1889 births
1970 deaths
Canadian Protestant missionaries
Protestant missionaries in Korea
Canadian veterinarians
Male veterinarians
English emigrants to Canada
University of Toronto alumni
Missionary educators
Canadian expatriates in Korea
Persons of National Historic Significance (Canada)

Korean independence activists